Jordanian Democratic People's Party ( Hizb Al-Sha'ab Al-Dimuqrati Al-Urduni, HASHD), is a communist party in Jordan. HASHD was formed in 1989, when the Democratic Front for the Liberation of Palestine separated their branch in Jordan to become a separate party.

HASHD publishes the weekly newspaper Al-Ahali. In the past, the party published the weekly newspaper al Lajna al Shaabiya.

See also
 List of political parties in Jordan

References

External links
Al-Ahali website 

1989 establishments in Jordan
Arab Nationalist Movement breakaway groups
Communist parties in Jordan
Democratic Front for the Liberation of Palestine
Political parties established in 1989
Political parties in Jordan
Secularism in Jordan